Edwin Jay "Bud" VanDeWege, Jr. (born April 24, 1958) is a former American basketball coach.  He was the head coach of the Michigan Wolverines women's basketball team from 1984 to 1992, compiling a record of 93–132 (41–103 Big Ten) in eight seasons at Michigan.  After leading the team to its first 20-win season and its first NCAA Tournament appearance, he was named Big Ten Coach of the Year in 1990.  He is the second winningest head coach in the history of Michigan's women's basketball program.

University of Michigan
In May 1984, VanDeWege was named interim head coach of the Michigan Wolverines women's basketball team, following the resignation of Gloria Soluk  He took over as the full-time head coach in the fall of 1984.  For the previous three years, he had been a part-time assistant on Bill Frieder's  coaching staff for the Michigan Wolverines men's basketball team. VanDeWege remained as the women's basketball coach from 1984 to 1992, compiling an overall record of 93–132 and a record of 41–103 against Big Ten Conference opponents.

As VanDeWege began his sixth season as head coach, his teams had finished in the bottom half of the Big Ten Conference every year, including two 10th-place finishes. The Michigan women's basketball team had not recorded a winning season in 18 years. VanDeWege then led the 1989–1990 team to a 20–10 record, the first 20-win season in program history and the first time the women's team had received an invitation to play in the NCAA Tournament.  At the end of the season, VanDeWege was named Big Ten Coach of the Year for 1990.

VanDeWege lost four of five starters to graduation after the 1989–1990 season, and his teams finished in ninth place in the Big Ten each of the next two seasons.  VanDeWege resigned after the 1991–1992 season.  His 93 career wins at Michigan made him the winningest head coach in Michigan women's basketball history until Sue Guevara recorded her 94th win in November 2001.  He currently ranks second behind Guevara in career coaching wins with the program.

Moe's Sports Shop
VanDeWege was raised in Ann Arbor, Michigan, and graduated from the University of Michigan in 1980. His father, Edwin Jay "Bud" VanDeWege, Sr., began working in 1964 at Moe Sports Shop on North University Avenue in Ann Arbor and purchased the business in 1971.  VanDeWege, Jr., took over the business in later years and sold the shop in April 2010.

Coaching record

References

Living people
1958 births
American women's basketball coaches
Michigan Wolverines men's basketball coaches
Michigan Wolverines women's basketball coaches
University of Michigan alumni
Sportspeople from Ann Arbor, Michigan